Tā Chilā Provincial Park, formerly Boya Lake Provincial Park, is a provincial park located in the Stikine Region of British Columbia, Canada. The park located 120 km north-by-northwest of the community of Dease Lake near BC Highway 37 (the Stewart–Cassiar Highway). Boya Lake is named for Charlie Boya, a First Nations man from the area.

References

External links

Provincial parks of British Columbia
Cassiar Country
1965 establishments in British Columbia